The ARIA Albums Chart ranks the best-performing albums and extended plays (EPs) in Australia. Its data, published by the Australian Recording Industry Association, is based collectively on the weekly physical and digital sales of albums and EPs. In 2016, 43 albums claimed the top spot, Adele's 25, and Disturbed's Immortalized already peaked at number one in 2015, and 13 acts achieved their first number-one album in Australia: The 1975, Matt Corby, Violent Soho, Zayn, Lukas Graham, Deftones, Drake, The Avalanches, Frank Ocean, A Day to Remember, Sticky Fingers, Jessica Mauboy and Illy.

Chart history

Number-one artists

See also
2016 in music
List of number-one singles of 2016 (Australia)

References

2016
Australia albums
Number-one albums